Anqing Normal University , it is an undergraduate normal university in Anhui Province, located in Anqing City, Anhui Province, China.

History
The origins of the college date back to 1897, when the earliest and largest provincial school in Anhui, Jinfu Academy, was relocated to Linghu Campus. Famed pundits and traditional scholars such as Liu Dagui, Wang Liangwu, Quan Zuwang and Yao Nai, all served as the headmaster (equivalent to president nowadays). In 1898, the Guangxu Emperor of the Qing dynasty ordered it be renamed as Qiushi Academy. In 1902, it was called Anhui Grand Academy. Later, it became Anhui Military Academy, Anhui Army's Academy, and Anhui Judicial and Political College. In 1928, Anhui Provincial University was formed here. In 1946, it became National Anhui University and thus attained its climax in Chinese modern history of higher education.

After the establishment of the People's Republic of China in 1949, due to the drift of the political center, the school witnessed a series of alterations, though the education mission has never been discontinued. It once became a Navy academy, a normal college, and a branch campus of Anhui Normal College. In May 1980, upon the approval of the State Council, it was renamed Anqing Teachers College and changed to Anqing Normal University in 2016.

Anqing Normal University established a sister institution partnership with Salisbury University in Maryland, United States. Two Salisbury University undergraduate students were the very first to study abroad, at Anqing Teacher's College, and did so during the entire Fall Semester in 2010.  In turn, two undergraduate students and a graduate student were the first Chinese students to come to Salisbury University from Anqing.

References

External links
Official website of  Anqing Teachers College

Teachers colleges in China
Educational institutions established in 1898
Universities and colleges in Anhui
1898 establishments in China